This is the complete list of Commonwealth Games medallists in gymnastics.  The sport was first included in  1978, was dropped for 1982 and 1986, and then returned for the Games in 1990. since when it has been held as part of every edition of the Games.

Men's artistic

All-around

Team

Horizontal bar

Parallel bars

Vault

Pommel horse

Rings

Floor

Women's artistic

All-around

Team

Uneven bars

Beam

Vault

Floor

Women's rhythmic

All-around

Ball

Hoop

Ribbon

Rope

Clubs

Team

References
Results Database from the Commonwealth Games Federation

Gymnastics
Medalists

Commonwealth